Berea is an unincorporated community in Giles County, in the U.S. state of Tennessee.

History
The community was named after the biblical place of Berea.

References

Unincorporated communities in Giles County, Tennessee
Unincorporated communities in Tennessee